Interstate 110 (I-110) is a  interstate spur route in El Paso extending from I-10 (I-10), south along U.S. Route 54 (US 54), turns west then turns south into Mexico. I-110 provides access from I-10 to the Bridge of the Americas, which spans the Rio Grande to connect with Avenida Abraham Lincoln in Ciudad Juárez, Mexico. I-110 is currently the only three-digit interstate to connect directly with Mexico, and one of only two to connect to an international border, the other being I-190 in New York.

Route description

I-110 is a short spur route of I-10 in El Paso that connects I-10 with the Cordova International Bridge at the United States–Mexico border. The highway begins at its southern terminus, the beginning of the Bridge of the Americas, which spans the Rio Grande and connects to Mexican Federal Highway 45 (Fed 45). The route proceeds north, crossing over all six lanes of Texas State Highway Loop 375 (Loop 375), the Cesar E. Chavez Border Highway, and the divided Delta Drive. Immediately after passing over Delta Drive, the highway's truck lanes split off and pass through a specialized customs area. The roadway's main lanes proceed northward through the Cordova Point of Entry, where each vehicle is searched by the U.S. Border Patrol. The route continues north, traveling parallel to Chamizal National Memorial, before splitting off and reaching an interchange with US 62 , East Paisano Drive. The road bends eastward, traveling past several houses and businesses, before it reaches an incomplete interchange with US 54, the Patriot Freeway. From the interchange, I-110 proceeds north as a complex series of three-level entrance and exit ramps, unofficially referred to as the "Spaghetti Bowl". The ramps merge into US 54, and the roadway continues concurrently with it, passing over Lincoln Park before reaching its northern terminus, an interchange with I-10. US 54 continues northward from the interchange. The Texas Department of Transportation (TxDOT) lists I-110's official length as being , while the Federal Highway Administration (FHWA) lists it as being .

History
I-110 was officially designated as a route from I-10 to the Cordova International Bridge in 1967. The interchange at US 62 was completed in 1970. By 1972, the interchange at US 54 had been completed. The overpass at Texas State Highway 20 (SH 20) and the interchange at I-10 were completed in 1973.

Exit list

See also

References

External links

10-1 Texas
10-1
1 Texas
Transportation in El Paso County, Texas